Luis Sánchez (born 12 September 1940) is a Spanish alpine skier. He competed at the 1960 Winter Olympics and the 1964 Winter Olympics.

References

1940 births
Living people
Spanish male alpine skiers
Olympic alpine skiers of Spain
Alpine skiers at the 1960 Winter Olympics
Alpine skiers at the 1964 Winter Olympics
Sportspeople from Madrid
20th-century Spanish people